Schwarzenborn is the smallest town in Hesse, Germany.

Geography

Location
Schwarzenborn lies in the Schwalm-Eder district some 13.5 km from Homberg in the Knüll. Through the constituent community of Grebenhagen flows the river Efze.

Constituent communities
The town consists of the two centres of Grebenhagen and Schwarzenborn.

Politics

Coat of arms
Schwarzenborn's civic coat of arms might be heraldically described thus: Argent a goat-headed spreadeagle sable langued gules, surmounted by an inescutcheon sable a mullet of six Or.

Schwarzenborn's arms bear a likeness to both Neukirchen's and Schwalmstadt's. All three have the goat-headed spreadeagle and a star on the inescutcheon (small shield within the bigger one), but colouring varies among the three.

Town partnerships
  Saint-Gervais-sur-Roubion, France since 7 May 2005

Economy and infrastructure
The town is well known for being a Bundeswehr base with a large training area, furnishing some 300 jobs to local civilians, making the Bundeswehr the town's biggest employer. The garrison is home of the Jägerregiment 1 (1st Ranger Regiment), which is the infantry element of the German Army's Luftbewegliche Brigade 1 (1st Air Mobile Brigade) at Fritzlar Army Base.

Transport
The Hersfeld-West Autobahn interchange on the A 7 (Kassel – Würzburg) is about 15 km away.

Schwarzenborn is joined to the railway network through the stations at Schwalmstadt-Treysa and Bad Hersfeld.

References

External links
 Schwarzenborn

Towns in Hesse
Schwalm-Eder-Kreis